Lady J (French: Mademoiselle de Joncquières) is a 2018 French period drama film directed by Emmanuel Mouret and inspired by a story in Denis Diderot's novel Jacques the Fatalist, which had already been adapted in 1945 for the film Les Dames du Bois de Boulogne by Robert Bresson. Set in France before 1789, it stars Cécile de France as Madame de La Pommeraye, an attractive widow whose bachelor lover, the Marquis des Arcis (Édouard Baer), will not propose to her and gets her revenge by tricking him into marrying Mademoiselle de Joncquières (Alice Isaaz), a former prostitute.

Plot
Madame de La Pommeraye, a young and pretty widow who boasts that she has never been in love, ends up yielding to the advances of the Marquis des Arcis, a well-known libertine, who is diligently and obsessively courting her. When after two years the Marquis begins to neglect Madame de La Pommeraye, she suggests to him that their feeling for each other has faded. He, instead of denying this, agrees wholeheartedly. Deeply hurt by his rejection, she plots revenge.

She knows of an unfortunate noblewoman and her illegitimate daughter, Mademoiselle de Joncquières, who survive by entertaining men in a nightclub. Moving them into an apartment, she asks them to dress in black like devout Catholics and walk in the park. There she introduces them to the Marquis, who is struck on the spot by the beauty of the girl. Madame de La Pommeraye claims not to know where they live, so he hires detectives and lays siege to the girl. On instructions from Madame de La Pommeraye, she refuses all offers short of marriage.

On the wedding night, the Marquis says he will not take her virginity until she feels ready. The next morning, Madame de La Pommeraye calls to take the bridal pair for a drive. Stopping outside the club, she tells the Marquis that this is where his wife and mother-in-law used to work. In fury and disgust, the Marquis rejects his wife and goes home. There he finds her, saved from the river into which she had thrown herself. The next morning, when she has recovered, he tells her the marriage is over and she is free to go off with whoever she wants.

She asks him to forget the past life into which misfortune had led her and to forgive her part in the cruel trick which Madame de La Pommeraye had played. Her honesty touches his heart, and they are reconciled. Madame de La Pommeraye's friend dares not tell her that the two are now a happy couple.

Cast
 Cécile de France as Madame de La Pommeraye
 Édouard Baer as the Marquis des Arcis
 Alice Isaaz  as Mademoiselle de Joncquières
 Natalia Dontcheva as Madame de Joncquières, her mother
 Laure Calamy as Lucienne, friend of Madame de La Pommeraye

Release
The film opened in French theaters in September 2018. It also screened at the 2018 Toronto International Film Festival, as part of the Platform program. Netflix obtained rights to stream the film in the US and internationally.

References

External links
 

2018 films
2010s historical drama films
French historical drama films
2010s French-language films
Films directed by Emmanuel Mouret
2018 drama films
2010s French films